The 25th South American U18 Championships in Athletics were held in Encarnación, Paraguay, on 25 and 26 September 2021.

Medal summary

Boys

Girls

Mixed

Medal table

References

South American U18 Championships in Athletics
South American U18 Championships in Athletics
South American U18 Championships in Athletics
South American U18 Championships in Athletics
International athletics competitions hosted by Paraguay
South American U18 Championships in Athletics